The year 1921 in architecture involved some significant architectural events and new buildings.

Events
 March – Puhl & Wagner are contracted to decorate the interior of the Golden Hall (Stockholm City Hall) with neo-Byzantine mosaics designed by Einar Forseth.
 March 21 – Teatro Yagüez in Puerto Rico, designed by José Sabàs Honoré, reopens.
 May 27 – A Buddha image is enshrined in the main hall of the Daifukuji Soto Zen Mission in Hawai'i, as part of a dedication ceremony for the building.
 September 5 – The Cervantes Theatre in Buenos Aires, Argentina, opens with a production of Lope de Vega's La dama boba.
 Hugo Häring and Ludwig Mies van der Rohe submit a competition entry for a Friedrichstrasse office building, fully made of glass.
 Construction work begins on the Watts Towers in Los Angeles, designed by Simon Rodia.

Buildings and structures

Buildings opened
January 23 – Ohel Rachel Synagogue in Shanghai, China, designed by Robert Bradshaw Moorhead and Sidney Joseph Halse, is dedicated.
March 3 – New terminal at the Central railway station, Sydney, Australia, complete with clock tower.
May 2 – Cunard Building (New York City), designed by Benjamin Wistar Morris with consultants Carrère and Hastings.
October 26 – The Chicago Theatre movie palace in the United States.
October 28 – The Theater Pathé Tuschinski movie/live theatre in Amsterdam, designed by Hijman Louis de Jong.

Buildings completed

 The Einstein Tower near Potsdam, Germany, designed by Erich Mendelsohn.
 Berliner Tageblatt, designed by Erich Mendelsohn.
 Harkness Tower in Yale University in New Haven, Connecticut, United States, after 4 years of construction.
 The Corn Palace in Mitchell, South Dakota, United States is completed (except for domes added in 1937).
 The Wong Tai Sin Temple (Hong Kong) is moved to its current site and completed.
 New Hindu Durgiana Temple in Amritsar.
 Michel de Klerk's Het Schip housing development for Eigen Haard in Amsterdam.
 Monument to the March Dead (Denkmal der Märzgefallenen), by Walter Gropius in Weimar, Germany.
 The Mayslake Peabody Estate in Oak Brook, Illinois, United States.
 Wolseley House (showroom and offices), 160 Piccadilly, London, designed by William Curtis Green.

Designs
 Adolf Loos designs a mausoleum for Max Dvořák that is never built.

Awards
 American Academy of Arts and Letters Gold Medal – Cass Gilbert.
 RIBA Royal Gold Medal – Edwin Lutyens.

Births
 January 15 – Ulrich Franzen, German-born American "Brutalist" architect, in Düsseldorf (died 2012)
 February 26 – Angelo Mangiarotti, Italian architect and industrial designer, in Milan (died 2012)
 March 14 – Ada Louise Huxtable, New York architecture critic and writer (died 2013)
 July 22 – Colin Madigan, Australian architect (died 2011)
 September 6 – Lyubow Demeetriyevna Oosava, Russian-born Belarusian architect (died 2015)

Deaths
 March 3 – Pierre Cuypers, Dutch church and museum architect (born 1827)
 May 18 – Martin Nyrop, Danish architect of Copenhagen City Hall (born 1849)
 June 1 – Sir Robert Rowand Anderson, Scottish Victorian architect (born 1834)
 December 10 – George Ashlin, Irish ecclesiastical architect (born 1837)

References